The Hurel-Dubois Miles HDM.105 was a transport aircraft fitted with very high aspect ratio wings for research purposes, building on research carried out with the Hurel-Dubois HD.10, and a stepping point to the planned production HDM.106 Caravan. The HDM.105/HDM.106 provided the starting point for the design of the Short SC.7 Skyvan.

Design and development
, a French aircraft designer, became a champion of very high aspect ratio wings in a bid to significantly reduce induced drag, similar to the "Davis Wing" of the Consolidated B-24 Liberator, but with much higher aspect ratios.

The HDM.105 utilised the fuselage, tail unit and engines from Miles Aerovan Mk.4 G-AOJF, fitted with a Hurel designed  span 20.5:1 aspect ratio wing of NACA laminar flow sections, supported on aerofoil section lifting struts. The wings were fitted with double-slotted flaps actuated by Miles electric actuators from the original Aerovan. Roll control was by differential ailerons and inter-connected upper-surface spoilers. With no room for fuel in the slender wings,  fuel tanks were fitted in the vertical undercarriage strut fairings.

Operational history
The HDM.105, with B-class registration G-35-3 (subsequently re-registered G-AHDM), was first flown on 31 March 1957 by I.A. Forbes, but was later damaged beyond repair in a landing accident at Shoreham on 28 June 1958 and dismantled.

Variants

HDM.106 Caravan
Following the successful testing of the HDM.105 the joint company H.D. et M (Aviation) Ltd, was established to exploit derivatives. The HDM.106 Caravan was to have been an all-metal transport aircraft, with  span wings, powered by 2x  Lycoming GO-480, 2x  Lycoming GSO-480B or 2x  Turbomeca Astazou I engines, but the HDM.106 did not progress beyond the drawing board with H.D.
et M (Aviation) Ltd.

The design for the HDM.106 was sold to Shorts who developed it into the very successful Short SC.7 Skyvan, but with a much reduced, moderately high, aspect ratio of 11:1.

HDM.107 Aerojeep
The H.D.M.107, known as the Aerojeep, was a military version of the HDM.106 to a STOL light transport requirement of the US Army, to be powered by two  Lycoming T53 turboprop engines.

HDM.108
An enlarged HDM.106 designed by Hurel-Dubois.

Miles M.111
The Miles M.111 was proposed as a light single-engined transport utilising the outer wings and struts of the HDM.105, powered by a single  Turbomeca Astazou turboprop engine.

Specifications (HDM.105)

References

Miles aircraft
Hurel-Dubois aircraft